Jales is a town in Brazil.

Jaleș is  tributary of the river Tismana in Romania.

Jales may also refer to:
 Microregion of Jales, on the northwest of São Paulo state, Brazil
 Roman Catholic Diocese of Jales
 Alfarela de Jales, a parish of Portugal, in Vila Pouca de Aguiar, Vila Real
 Vreia de Jales, a parish of Portugal, in Vila Pouca de Aguiar, Vila Real

People with the surname
 Dick Jales (1922–2004), English professional footballer
 Otacilio Jales, (born 1984), Brazilian footballer